Bergenstammia is a genus of flies in the family Empididae. It is sometime treated as a sub-genus of Clinocera

Species
B. albanica Wagner, 1993
B. aurinae Pusch & Wagner, 1993
B. carniolica Horvat, 1994
B. frigida (Vaillant, 1964)
B. multiseta Strobl, 1893
B. nudimana (Vaillant, 1973)
B. nudipes (Loew, 1858)
B. pulla Vaillant & Wagner, 1989
B. pyrenaica Vaillant & Vincon, 1987
B. slovaca Wagner, 1984
B. thomasi Vaillant & Vincon, 1998

References

Empidoidea genera
Empididae